Sand Masters is an American reality-television series that premiered on June 1, 2011, on the Travel Channel. The show follows a team of sand sculptors as they travel to various locales to create elaborate sand structures for their business clients. The first two episodes of the series premiered on June 1, 2011, at 10:00pm, but it was moved to Sundays at 7:00pm EST. Season two aired on Thursday, April 5, 2012, at 9:00pm EST. The show was canceled after Season 2.

Premise
"A team of six talented sand sculptors travel all over the world to create unimaginable, massive masterpieces made from sand. These "Sand Masters" design colossal works of art while battling seemingly insurmountable challenges—unpredictable weather, wildly ambitious designs and overly demanding business clients."

The series intro is narrated by Rusty Croft. The first series intro, set to Mr. Sandman:

Second season intro:

Sand Sculptors
Rusty Croft - Team leader and sand sculptor planner/all around designer.
Kirk Rademaker - Designs abstract, mechanical pieces in the sand with his over-the-top style.
Sue McGrew - Sculpting figures in the sand is her specialty with her organic, flowing feminine style.
Morgan Rudluff - Great at carving logos, lettering, and banners out of sand.
Matt Long - sand sculptor from New York, great at carving figures and fine details.
Andy Gertler - Architectural designs, great at carving buildings and structures.
Chris Guinto - A 10-year sand sculptor specializing in marine life and all kinds of animals. He also wrestles crocodiles and alligators for a living. (Ep.12, 13, 16/Joins the team full-time in Season 2)

Production Crew (additional)
Note: Crew members not listed in production infobox above.

Co-Executive Producers - Ross Kaiman, Aaron Fishman
VP Finance & Operations - Frances Fleming
Line Producer - Laura Sweet
Supervising Post Producer - Steve Durgin
Story Producers - Ali Zubik, Graham Hughes, Eric Smith, Kim Devore, Matt Pella
Segment Producer - Angela Shin
Associate Producers - Derek Helwig, Jason Wright
Field Production Coordinator - Alex Fleming
Office Production Coordinator - Daniel Meincke
Executive Assistant - Jennifer Corley
Camera - Jonathan Wenstrup, Vanessa Joy Smith (additional)
Director of Post Production - Doug Levy
Post Production Supervisor - Stuart Otroshkin
Post Production Coordinator - Doug Sanford

Episodes

Season 1 (2011)

Season 2 (2012)

References

External links
 

http://www.tvtango.com/series/sand_masters

2011 American television series debuts
2010s American reality television series
English-language television shows
Television shows set in the United States
Travel Channel original programming
Sand